Antonino Votto, sometimes spelled Antonio Votto, (30 October 1896 – 9 September 1985) was an Italian operatic conductor and vocal coach. Votto developed an extensive discography with the Teatro alla Scala in Milan during the 1950s, when EMI produced the bulk of its studio recordings featuring Maria Callas. Though Votto was a dependable conductor (and the teacher of Riccardo Muti), critics frequently faulted his recordings for their lack of emotional immediacy. This may have been an occupational hazard of working in the studio, as his live sets with Callas, including a Norma (December 1955, La Scala)  and La sonnambula (1957, Cologne) are considered to be great performances. Among his pupils was soprano Claudia Pinza Bozzolla.

Commercial discography 

 Ponchielli: La Gioconda (Callas, Barbieri, Amadini, Poggi, Silveri, Neri; 1952) Cetra
 Puccini: La bohème (Callas, Moffo, di Stefano, Panerai, Zaccaria; 1956) EMI
 Verdi: Un ballo in maschera (Callas, Ratti, Barbieri, di Stefano, Gobbi; 1956) EMI
 Bellini: La sonnambula (Callas, Ratti, Monti, Zaccaria; 1957) EMI
 Ponchielli: La Gioconda (Callas, Cossotto, Companeez, Ferraro, Cappuccilli, Vinco; 1959) EMI
 Puccini: La bohème (Scotto, Poggi, Gobbi, Modesti; 1961) Deutsche Grammophon
 Verdi: La traviata (Scotto, G.Raimondi, Bastianini; 1962) Deutsche Grammophon

References 
 The Concise Oxford Dictionary of Opera, by John Warrack and Ewan West, Oxford University Press, 1996. 

1896 births
1985 deaths
Italian male conductors (music)
20th-century Italian conductors (music)
20th-century Italian male musicians